Spring Place (also Poinset, Springplace) is an unincorporated community in Murray County, Georgia, United States.

History
A post office was established at Spring Place in 1826. The community took its name from Spring Place Mission, a nearby Native American Moravian mission.

Spring Place held the county seat of Murray County from 1834 until the seat was transferred to Chatsworth in 1913.

The Georgia General Assembly incorporated Spring Place as a town in 1885. The town's municipal charter was repealed in 1995.

Notable person
Kate Galt Zaneis (1887-1973), educator, was born in Spring Place.

Historic Site
Chief Vann House Historic Site is on the National Register of Historic Places listings in Murray County, Georgia as the Vann House.

Notes

Former municipalities in Georgia (U.S. state)
Unincorporated communities in Murray County, Georgia
Unincorporated communities in Georgia (U.S. state)
Populated places disestablished in 1995